Hassan Muath Fallatah (born 27 January 1986, in Medina) is a Saudi Arabian footballer who plays as a right back.

Club career

Al-Shabab
In 2004, Hassan moved to Al-Shabab from Al-Ansar. In his second season, he won the League. On 30 November 2008, Hassan scored his first goal for Al-Shabab against Al-Raed in the 45+3 minutes, they won 4-0. In 2014, Hassan won the league and the Super Cup. He left Al-Shabab in 2017.

Al-Fayha
On 13 July 2017, Hassan moved to newly promoted Al-Fayha from Al-Shabab with a two-year professional contract. On 10 August, Hassan played his debut in the league against Al-Hilal which Al-Fayha lost 2-1.

Al-Shabab
In January 2018, Hassan moved to Al-Shabab from Al-Fayha until end of the season.

Al-Ittihad
In July 2018, Hassan moved to Al-Ittihad with a two-year professional contract.

Career statistics

International goals
Scores and results list Saudi Arabia's goal tally first.

Hounors

Club
Saudi Professional League (2): 2005-06, 2011-12
Kings Cup (3): 2008, 2009, 2014
Saudi Super Cup (1): 2014

References

External links

1986 births
Living people
Saudi Arabian footballers
Saudi Arabia international footballers
Al-Ansar FC (Medina) players
Al-Shabab FC (Riyadh) players
Al-Fayha FC players
Ittihad FC players
Al-Ain FC (Saudi Arabia) players
2015 AFC Asian Cup players
Saudi Professional League players
Sportspeople from Riyadh
Association football defenders